Tristan Schoolkate (born 26 February 2001) is an Australian professional tennis player. Schoolkate made his ATP Tour debut at the 2021 Great Ocean Road Open after receiving a wild card into the main draw.

Personal life
Schoolkate began playing tennis at age four and was initially coached by his father, who was a tennis coach at Claremont Lawn Tennis Club.

In August 2015, Schoolkate represented Australia at the ITF World Junior Tennis Finals in Prostejov, Czech Republic.

Career

2019–2020: Career Beginnings
Schoolkate made his ITF Men's World Tennis Tour main draw debut in Darwin in September 2019 and his ATP Challenger Tour main draw debut in October 2019 in Traralgon.

2021: ATP debut and first ITF Titles
In January 2021, Schoolkate made the second round of the 2021 Australian Open – Men's singles qualifying, losing to Bernard Tomic. Schoolkate was awarded a wild card into the 2021 Great Ocean Road Open, where he made his ATP tour main draw debut, losing in straight sets to Botic van de Zandschulp.

In September 2021, Schoolkate won his first ITF singles title in Plaisir, France.

In October 2021, Schoolkate won his first ITF doubles title.

2022
Schoolkate lost in the first round of the 2022 Australian Open – Men's singles qualifying.

In April 2022, Schoolkate achieved a new career-high ranking of 505, after a finals appearance at Canberra.

Performance timelines

Only main-draw results in ATP Tour, Grand Slam tournaments, Davis Cup and Olympic Games are included in win–loss records.

Singles
Current after the 2022 French Open

Doubles 
Current after the 2022 Australian Open

ATP Challenger and ITF World Tennis Tour finals

Singles: (2–3)

Doubles: 11 (7 titles, 4 runner-ups)

References

External links
 
 
 Tristan Schoolkate at Tennis Australia

2001 births
Living people
Australian male tennis players
Tennis players from Perth, Western Australia